Fenclozic acid is an analgesic, antipyretic, and anti-inflammatory drug. It has been withdrawn in 1970 due to jaundice.

References

Thiazoles
Acetic acids
Chloroarenes
Hepatotoxins
Nonsteroidal anti-inflammatory drugs
Withdrawn drugs